CEF4 or CeF4 could signify:
 Airdrie Aerodrome, an airport with the identifier code of CEF4
 Cerium(IV) fluoride, a compound with the chemical formula of CeF4